The Embassy of Hungary in London is the diplomatic mission of Hungary in the United Kingdom. Opposite the embassy itself can be found the Hungarian Economic, Investment & Trade Commission and the Hungarian National Tourist Office at 46 Eaton Place. A Hungarian Cultural Centre is also maintained at 10 Maiden Lane in Covent Garden.

Gallery

References

External links
Official site

Hungary
Diplomatic missions of Hungary
Hungary–United Kingdom relations
Buildings and structures in the City of Westminster
Belgravia